Commonweal Party was an Indian political party that existed in Tamil Nadu between 1951 and 1954. It was started by M. A. Manickavelu Naicker and claimed to represent the interests of the Vanniyar caste. It merged with Indian National Congress in 1954. The party won three seats in the 1952 Lok Sabha election and six seats in the Madras State legislative assembly elections.

References 

Defunct political parties in Tamil Nadu
1951 establishments in Madras State
1954 disestablishments in India
Political parties established in 1951
Political parties disestablished in 1954